Aizawl district is one of the eleven districts of Mizoram state in India. The district is bounded on the north by Kolasib district, on the west by Mamit district, on the south by Serchhip district, on the southwest by Lunglei district and on the east by Champhai district. The headquarters of the district is Aizawl city, the capital of Mizoram. As of 2011 it is the most populous district of Mizoram (then out of 8, now 11).

Etymology
The district is named after its headquarters, Aizawl city.

Geography
This district is bounded by Assam in the North, Manipur in the North East, Champhai District in the East, Serchhip District in the South, Lunglei District in the South West, Mamit District in the West and Kolasib District in the North West.

Divisions
The district has 5 R.D. Blocks, Aibawk, Darlawn, Phullen, Thingsulthliah and Tlangnuam.

The district has 14 legislative assembly constituencies. These are Tuivawl, Chalfilh, Tawi, Aizawl North 1, Aizawl North 2, Aizawl North 3, Aizawl East 1, Aizawl East 2, Aizawl West 1, Aizawl West 2, Aizawl West 3, Aizawl South 1, Aizawl South 2 and Aizawl South 3.

Transport
Lengpui Airport, located at a distance of 32 km from Aizawl city provides connection with Kolkata and Guwahati by daily flights and with Imphal by three flights a week.

Demographics

According to the 2011 census Aizawl district has a population of 400,309, roughly equal to the nation of Brunei. This gives it a ranking of 557th in India (out of a total of 640). Its population growth rate over the decade 2001-2011 was  24.07%.	Aizawl	has a sex ratio of 	1009 females for every 1000 males, and a literacy rate of 98.5%.

Languages
Mizo languages spoken in Aizawl district include:

Paite language
Ralte language
Biate language
Bawm language
Hakha Chin language
Hmar language
Pangkhu language
Falam Chin language
Tedim Chin language
Thado language
Zou language
Simte language
Chakma language
Aimol language
Hrangkhol language
Mizo language

The major population speaks Mizo, the official language of the state, which is also known as 'Lusei/Lushai' or 'Duhlian'.

References

External links
Aizawl district official website
Aizawl district

 
Districts of Mizoram